The 1993 Prix de l'Arc de Triomphe was a horse race held at Longchamp on Sunday 3 October 1993. It was the 72nd running of the Prix de l'Arc de Triomphe.

The winner was Urban Sea, a four-year-old filly trained in France by Jean Lesbordes. The winning jockey was Eric Saint-Martin.

Race details
 Sponsor: CIGA Hotels
 Purse: 8,500,000 F; First prize: 5,000,000 F
 Going: Heavy
 Distance: 2,400 metres
 Number of runners: 23
 Winner's time: 2m 37.9s

Full result

 Abbreviations: hd = head; nk = neck

Winner's details
Further details of the winner, Urban Sea.
 Sex: Filly
 Foaled: 18 February 1989
 Country: United States
 Sire: Miswaki; Dam: Allegretta (Lombard)
 Owner: David Tsui
 Breeder: Marystead Farm

References

External links
 Colour Chart – Arc 1993

Prix de l'Arc de Triomphe
 1993
1993 in Paris
1993 in French sport
October 1993 sports events in Europe